The Auburn Tigers Australian Football Club is an Australian rules football club based in the Western Suburbs of Sydney, Australia. The club colours are black and yellow and they are nicknamed the Tigers. Auburn won the Fourth Division premiers in the Sydney AFL league in their inaugural season, being undefeated for the whole season.  The following year they went up two divisions and still made the finals.

Auburn Tigers joined the Sydney competition in 2010 embracing the influence set by AFL NSW/ACT to establish another Australian rules football team in the heart of Western Sydney, Auburn.  They also field a predominantly Muslim women's team.

The home Ground for Auburn Tigers is at Mona Park, Auburn NSW.

References

External links
Auburn Tigers sportingpulse website

Auburn
2010 establishments in Australia
Australian rules football clubs established in 2010